The Otobreda 127mm/54 Compact (127/54C) gun is a dual purpose naval artillery piece built by the Italian company Oto Melara. It uses the 127mm round which is also used in the 5 inch/ 54 gun, albeit that this gun calibre is measured in United States customary units rather than metric. The gun uses an automatic loading system where 66 127mm rounds of various kinds can be stored ready-to-fire in three loader drums (each holding 22 rounds). The barrel is water-cooled. Currently the gun is still in use by navies around the world but it is slowly being replaced by the Otobreda 127/64 for new vessels, such as the German Navy's F125-class frigate and Italian Navy's FREMM.

OTO Melara 127/64 

A replacement of the 127/54 compact, Oto Melara started the design in 1992, and completed it in 2003.  The new lightweight gun, weighing 17 tons without magazine or ammunition handling, has a rate of fire of 35 rpm, and can fire the long range guided Vulcano ammunition.

Operators 

The Otobreda 127/54 Compact is used in the following countries and ship classes:

Current operators

 

   (before TRUMP modifications, retired 2017)

  (retired)
 
 
 

 
 

 

 MEKO 360 frigate

 Lupo-class frigate

 

 Lupo-class frigate

See also

Weapons of comparable role, performance and era
 4.5 inch Mark 8 naval gun: contemporary standard naval gun for British ships
 5"/54 caliber Mark 45 gun: contemporary standard naval gun for US ships
 AK-130: contemporary 130 mm twin standard naval gun mounting for Russian ships
 H/PJ-38 130mm naval gun : contemporary 130 mm standard naval gun mounting for Chinese ships
 French 100 mm naval gun: contemporary standard naval gun for French ships

References

External links
 Link to the product on the manufacturer page
 Page from Nav weapons.com

127 mm artillery
Naval guns of Italy